They Will Drown in their Mothers' Tears is a 2017 novel by Swedish author Johannes Anyuru. It won the 2017 August Prize for Fiction. An English translation by Saskia Vogel was published in 2019.

References

2017 Swedish novels
Swedish-language novels
Novels set in Sweden
August Prize-winning works
Norstedts förlag books